Kiwuri (Aymara  canine tooth or tusk, -ri a suffix,  also spelled Kiburi, Quiburi) is a  mountain in the Andes of Bolivia. It is located in the Oruro Department, San Pedro de Totora Province.

References 

Mountains of Oruro Department